Józef Cepil (born 19 March 1960 in Parchocin) is a Polish politician. He was elected to Sejm on 25 September 2005, getting 10526 votes in 33 Kielce district as a candidate from Samoobrona Rzeczpospolitej Polskiej list.

He was also a member of Sejm 2001-2005.

See also
Members of Polish Sejm 2005-2007

External links
Józef Cepil - parliamentary page - includes declarations of interest, voting record, and transcripts of speeches.

1960 births
Living people
People from Busko County
Members of the Polish Sejm 2005–2007
Members of the Polish Sejm 2001–2005
Self-Defence of the Republic of Poland politicians